Devil's Playground is an Australian psychological thriller television series which premiered on Showcase on 9 September 2014. It was created as a sequel to the 1976 film, The Devil's Playground. The series begins in 1988 and follows the story of Tom Allen, a recently widowed psychiatrist and a secular counselor to the Catholic clergy, who becomes entangled in political and theological intrigue. Simon Burke reprised his role as Tom Allen.

Development
On 26 November 2012, Matchbox Pictures announced that they would produce a drama series for Foxtel that would serve as a continuation to the 1976 film The Devil's Playground.

The series is produced by Helen Bowden, Penny Chapman and Blake Ayshford and directed by Rachel Ward and Tony Krawitz. It is written by Blake Ayshford, Cate Shortland, Alice Addison and Tommy Murphy and the Executive Producers are Tony Ayres, Penny Win and Simon Burke.

Synopsis

The year is 1988. It is 35 years after the events of Fred Schepisi's classic film, The Devil's Playground. Tom Allen, now in his 40s and recently widowed, is a respected Sydney psychiatrist and father of two children. A practising Catholic, Tom accepts an offer by the Bishop of Sydney to become a counsellor of priests. During these sessions and other events, he uncovers a scandal that embroils him through a personal hell hole and the Church's various attempts to cover it up. Tom's quest for justice pushes him to his limits, but it reveals a dark-side of the Church's power and the extent of official corruption, which he could never have envisaged.

Cast
 Simon Burke as Tom Allen
 John Noble as Bishop John McNally
 Don Hany as Bishop Vincent Quaid
 Jack Thompson as Cardinal Constantine Neville
 Toni Collette as NSW MP Margaret Wallace
 Andrew McFarlane as Father Marco Andrassi
 Uli Latukefu as Father Matteo
 Max Cullen as Father Joyce
 Leon Ford as Brother Warren
 James Fraser as David Allen
 Malcolm Kennard as Joe Kelly
 Anna Lise Phillips as Alice Kelly
 Ben Hall as Finton Kelly
 Fletcher Watson as Peter Kelly
 Jason Klarwein as Matthew Darcy
 Jessica Donoghue as Catherine Darcy
 Jarin Towney as Elliot Darcy
 Coco Jack Gillies as Megan Darcy
 Avani Farriss as Rachel Darcy
 Matt Levett as Brendan Mahony
 Rory Potter as Cavanagh

Episodes

Awards and nominations

References

Australian drama television series
2014 Australian television series debuts
English-language television shows
Showcase (Australian TV channel) original programming
Television series by Matchbox Pictures